Papakura High School (PHS) is a co-educational state secondary school based in the Auckland suburb of Papakura in New Zealand, catering for students from Year 9 to Year 13.

The school was established in 1954 and is now made up of a diverse student body, administering students from the greater southern Auckland area. The school is located on the southern boundary of the Auckland metropolitan area, located approximately 32 kilometers south of Auckland CBD. In 2021 a school enrolment zone was introduced and encompasses the Papakura, Clevedon and Hunua area.

School structure

The school is organised into three whānau: Kirikiri, Te Apārangi, and Otuuwairoa. The school consulted the kaumātua (leaders) of their local iwi, Ngāti Tamaoho. In partnership with them, the three whānau were named after historic places in the Papakura area, which are locations of importance within the rohe of the local iwi. These three whānau replaced the school's old house structure at the beginning of the 2017 school year. 

Also in 2017, the school changed its school motto to Kia Rangatira. This whakataukī (Māori maxim) signifies a call to the young to step up as leaders. In Māori culture, it is a challenge to take on a chiefly demeanour in behaviour and attitudes, rangatira meaning high ranking, chiefly, noble, esteemed, in te reo (Māori).

ERO Reports

Although the Ministry of Education's Education Review Office (ERO) 2015 report was less positive, they summarised their 2020 report on Papakura High School with the remark "Leaders and staff are steadily improving outcomes for learners. Leaders have worked with determination to better serve students and their school community. Students, whānau, trustees and staff are expressing an increased optimism and pride in their school. The school has made significant improvement. The quality of teaching and curriculum design requires further development to improve student outcomes."

School curriculum

The school offers National Certificate of Educational Achievement (NCEA) as its national qualification standard. Students are able to sit NCEA Level 1 papers as early Year 11, however Papakura High School is one of the few colleges in Auckland to offer an NCEA Level 1 Humanities class to academically able Year 10 students also.

Selected senior students have the opportunity to participate in "Gateway", where they individually attend work experience placements during the school term, organised by the Careers department. The school also offers Correspondence papers for specialised subjects and regularly holds workshops and information sessions for students and their chosen programme.

The school also recently introduced national qualifications into unit standard courses of Mathematics, Sports and Recreation, Technology, and Catering, where students can work towards NCEA credits as well as gaining a national qualification. Papakura High School was the first school in New Zealand to offer the Marae Catering course under the NCEA structure.

Notable alumni
 Ioane Fitu Afoa - former All Black
 Jerome Kaino - former All Black 
 Jazz Tevaga - New Zealand Warriors & Toa Samoa 
 Patrick Mailata - New Zealand professional boxer
 Junior Fa - Tongan - New Zealand professional boxer and Commmonwealth Games Bronze Medallist

Notes

See also
 Papakura District
 Ministry of Education (New Zealand)

References

Educational institutions established in 1954
Secondary schools in Auckland
1954 establishments in New Zealand